Rockland Community Church and Cemetery (also known as Old Rockland Church; Rockland Memorial Community Church; United Brethren Church; Mt. Zion Church) is a historic church building at 24225 Rockland Road in Golden, Colorado.

It was built in 1879, dedicated on January 10, 1880, and was added to the National Register of Historic Places in 2009.

It was built by a Mr. Turner of Golden, Colorado.

References

Churches in Colorado
Churches on the National Register of Historic Places in Colorado
Victorian architecture in Colorado
Churches completed in 1880
Buildings and structures in Jefferson County, Colorado
National Register of Historic Places in Jefferson County, Colorado